This is a list of all captains of the Richmond Football Club, an Australian rules football club in the Australian Football League (AFL) and AFL Women's competition (AFLW).

AFL Women's

References

Richmond Football Club Honour Roll

Richmond
Captains
Richmond Football Club captains